Mackall is a surname. It is derived from the Gaelic MacCathail, meaning "son of Cathal". Early records of the name include M'Kawele in the late fourteenth-century, Makcaill in the early sixteenth century, and M'Call in the late sixteenth century.

People with the surname
Alexander Lawton Mackall (1888–1968), author, journalist, gastronomy expert and critic
Benjamin Mackall IV (1745–1807), American planter, lawyer, and jurist from Calvert County, Maryland
Corinne Lawton Mackall (1880–1955), American painter, humanitarian, and gardener
Lily Mackall, messenger for Rose Greenhow, a Confederate spy in the American Civil War
Steve Mackall, cartoon voice actor
William W. Mackall (1817–1891), Confederate general in the American Civil War

See also
Camp Mackall, active U.S. Army training facility in eastern Richmond County and northern Scotland County, North Carolina
Richards v. Mackall, 113 U.S. 539 (1885), appeal from the Supreme Court of the District of Columbia to the High Court

References

English-language surnames